Rhopobota hortaria is a species of moth of the family Tortricidae. It is found in New Caledonia and Australia, where it has been recorded from Victoria, New South Wales and Queensland.

The forewings have a brown pattern, which includes a dark brown bar running from the apex to the middle of the inner margin. The hindwings are brown.

The larvae have been recorded feeding on Polyscias elegans. They live in a shelter made of a rolled leaf of the host plant. The larvae are yellow with a greenish tinge and a black head. Pupation takes place in the larval shelter.

References

Moths described in 1911
Eucosmini